Rosa is a female given name, especially in the Spanish, Portuguese, and Italian languages.

Notable people with the name include:
Rosa de Lima, or Rose of Lima (1586–1617), Peruvian nun and saint
Rosa Silvana Abate (born 1963), Italian politician
Rosa Albach-Retty, Austrian movie and stage actress
Archduchess Rosa of Austria, Austrian princess
Rosa Balistreri, Sicilian musician
Rosa Benozzi Balletti, Italian-French actor
Rosa Blasi, American actress
Rosa Bonheur (1822–1899), French artist
Rosa Bouton (1860–1951), American chemist and professor
Rosa Nouchette Carey (1840–1909), English children's writer and popular novelist
Rosa de Carvalho Alvarenga (fl. 1857), African slave trader
Rosa Cedrón (born 1972), Spanish Galician singer and cellist
Rosa Cobo Bedía (born 1956), Spanish feminist, writer, and professor
Rosa (cow) (2001–2020), Spanish-born French cow and television personality 
Rosa DeLauro (born 1943), American politician
Rosa Leal de Pérez (born 1953), Guatemalan psychologist
Rosa Díez, Spanish politician
Rosa Eriksen (born 1990), Danish politician
Rosa Faccaro (1931–2019), Argentine art critic, painter and university teacher
Rosa Fuentes, Mexican swimmer
Rosa Guerra (1834–1864), Argentine educator, journalist, writer
Rosa Gumataotao Rios (born 1965), American government official
Rosa Jochmann, Austrian resistance activist and Ravensbrück survivor who became a politician (SPÖ)
Rosa Koian, human rights and environmentalism activist from Papua New Guinea
Rosa López, also known as "Rosa", Spanish singer and dancer
Rosa Lund (born 1986), Danish politician
Rosa Luxemburg, Polish communist leader
Rosa Mayreder, Austrian freethinker, author, painter, musician and feminist
Rosa Mota, Portuguese marathoner
Rosa Miller Avery (1830–1894), American abolitionist, political reformer, suffragist, writer
Rosa Mendes, half Costa Rican and half Czech professional wrestler
Rosa Menga (born 1992), Italian politician
Rosa Nissán (born 1939), Mexican writer
Rosa O'Neill, Irish wife of Owen Roe O'Neill
Rosa Orellana, American mathematician
Rosa Palomino, Aymara Indigenous leader in Peru
Rosa Parks, American civil rights icon
Rosa Regàs, Spanish writer
Rosa Rosà, Austrian writer
Rosa Russo Iervolino, Italian politician
Rosa Quintana (born 1959), Spanish civil servant and politician
Rosa (sea otter) (born 1999), oldest known living sea otter
Rosa Scarlatti, Italian opera singer
Rosa Stallbaumer, member of the Austrian Resistance during World War II
Rosa Valetti, German actress, cabaret performer and singer
Rosa Vecht (1881–1915), Dutch nurse
Rosa Vercellana, known as "Rosina" or "La Bela Rosin", mistress and later wife of Victor Emmanuel II, King of Italy
Rosa Ponselle, American operatic soprano
Rosa von Praunheim, German filmmaker and gay rights activist
Rosa Kershaw Walker (1840s–1909), American author, journalist, newspaper editor
Rosa Warrens (1821–1878), Swedish poet and translator
Rosa Louise Woodberry (1869–1932), American journalist, educator
Rosa Young (1890-1971), American educator

Middle name 
María Rosa Gallo, Argentinian actress

Fictional characters
 Rosa, a character in the 1990 American action comedy movie Kindergarten Cop
Rosa the protagonist of Pokémon Black 2 and White 2
Rosa (Castlevania), reluctant vampire in the video game Castlevania
Rosa Farrell, character in the game Final Fantasy IV
Rosa (Kizuna Encounter), the wild woman from the game Kizuna Encounter
Rosa Casagrande, a character in The Casagrandes
Colonel Rosa Klebb, the main antagonist of Ian Fleming's Bond novel, and subsequent film, From Russia, With Love 
Rosa del Valle, aka Rosa the Beautiful, character in the novel The House of the Spirits by Isabel Allende
Rosa Diaz, character in the TV series Brooklyn Nine-Nine
Princess Rosa Cossette D'Elise, character in the video game Ace Combat 7: Skies Unknown
Rosa Hubermann, the wife of Hans Hubermann and foster mother of Liesel Meminger in The Book Thief
Rosariki, a character in American animated children's television series GoGoRiki
Rosa Ushiromiya, character of Sound Novel Umineko no Naku Koro ni

See also
Rosa (surname)
Rosalind (disambiguation)
Rosamund

Given names derived from plants or flowers
Italian feminine given names
Portuguese feminine given names
Spanish feminine given names